Kurt A. Thoroughman (born 31 January 1972) is an Associate Professor in the Department of Biomedical Engineering at Washington University in St. Louis. He is known for his work in the study of motor control, motor learning, and computational neuroscience.

Thoroughman investigates how humans plan, control, and learn new movements. Understanding normal motor behavior and its neural basis will further the development of insightful clinical tests in movement neurology, and facilitate the early detection and treatment of motor diseases.

Thoroughman graduated with a PhD in Biomedical Engineering from Johns Hopkins University in 1999, completing a thesis in the Laboratory of Computational Motor Control, under the mentorship of Reza Shadmehr. After completion of his PhD, Thoroughman was a postdoctoral fellow with Eve Marder at Brandeis University.

Selected publications

References 
  - university biography

External links
 Laboratory of Neural Computation and Motor Behavior
 Washington University Biomedical Engineering Website
 Biomedical engineer shows how people learn motor skills
 Researchers find new learning strategy: A size of a mistake makes no difference

1972 births
Living people
21st-century American engineers
Washington University in St. Louis faculty